John N. Rottiers Farm is a historic home and farm complex located at Orleans in Jefferson County, New York. It is a two-story, three bay limestone structure built in 1833 with two, one story stone wings with Federal detailing.  Also on the property are a large dairy barn, servants' house, privy and the remains of a carriage barn.

It was listed on the National Register of Historic Places in 1996.

References

Houses on the National Register of Historic Places in New York (state)
Federal architecture in New York (state)
Houses completed in 1833
Houses in Jefferson County, New York
National Register of Historic Places in Jefferson County, New York
Farms on the National Register of Historic Places in New York (state)